The "Shadow Wolves" are a Native American tactical patrol unit assigned to Homeland Security Investigations (HSI) in Sells, Arizona located on the Tohono Oʼodham Nation that runs along the Mexico–United States border. 

The name "Shadow Wolves" refers to the way the unit hunts, like a wolf pack.

The Shadow Wolves specialize in the interdiction of human and drug smugglers through the rugged terrain of the Sonoran Desert utilizing both technology and the traditional art of tracking. Despite the use of high-tech equipment, the unit relies on their ability to track, a technique called "cutting for sign", which includes any kind of physical evidence left by smugglers (e.g., footprints, tire tracks, thread, clothing).

The unit boasts an esteemed history of tracking passed down from generation to generation.

Officers may spend hours or days tracking in the field following a "sign" until arrests and seizures are made, or it has been determined that the contraband has been loaded into a vehicle and transported from the area.

This elite unit was established by Congressional mandate in 1974 in response to rampant smuggling occurring through the Tohono O’odham Nation.

History

The "Shadow Wolves" law enforcement unit was created in 1972 by an Act of Congress, after the U.S. federal government agreed to the Tohono O'odham Nation's demand that the officers have at least one fourth Native American ancestry.  The Shadow Wolves became the first federal law enforcement agents allowed to operate on Tohono land.

The unit is congressionally authorized to have as many as 21 members but, as of March, 2007, it consisted of only 15 members. Members of the unit come from nine different tribes, including the Tohono O'odham, Blackfeet, Lakota, Navajo, Omaha, Sioux, and Yaqui.

Originally part of the U.S Customs Service, the Shadow Wolves became part of the Department of Homeland Security in 2003 when the U.S. Customs Service was folded into DHS.

On December 22, 2021, during the 117th Congress, Rep. John Katko (R-NY-24) introduced H.R. 5681, which proposed to broaden the Shadow Wolves' authorities while preserving the important legacy of the unit. The bill became Public Law 117-113 on April 19, 2022. The law provides flexibility to reclassify the Shadow Wolves, current and future, from GS-1801 Tactical Officers to GS-1811 Special Agents.

Official photographs

Key facts
 The Shadow Wolves are the Department of Homeland Security's only Native American tracking unit specifically utilized for targeted interdiction operations.
 The Tohono Oʼodham Nation, patrolled by the Shadow Wolves, covers  including a 76 mile (122 kilometer) stretch of land shared with Mexico. It is mainly made up of small, scattered villages.
 The Shadow Wolves are a key component of the Native American Targeted Investigations of Violent Enterprises (NATIVE) Task Force, a High Intensity Drug Trafficking Area (HIDTA) initiative formed in August 2013, to disrupt and dismantle drug trafficking organizations operating within or through the Tohono Oʼodham Nation. NATIVE’s partners include HSI, the Tohono O’odham Police Department, the Bureau of Indian Affairs-Drug Enforcement Division, the Drug Enforcement Administration, and the Bureau of Land Management.
 The Shadow Wolves' methodical approach has enabled them to track and apprehend smugglers in parts of the Southwestern U.S. across arduous desert terrain and rugged mountainous areas where tracks left by smugglers may be no more than an overturned pebble or an almost indistinguishable impression in the sand.
 An experienced Shadow Wolf can spot small items snagged on branches, twigs bent or broken, or even a single fiber of cloth or burlap from a sack or bag that could be filled with drugs. They can read faint footprints in the dust and determine when they were made, where they came from and whether or not traffickers are carrying additional weight such as backpacks filled with drugs.
 The current unit consists of 15 Native American Patrol Officers representing nine Native American tribes (Tohono Oʼodham, Navajo, Kiowa, Sioux, Blackfeet, Yurok, Omaha, Yaqui, and Pima) who employ traditional tracking skills combined with modern law enforcement technology to enforce immigration and customs laws on the  stretch of land the Tohono Oʼodham Nation shares with Mexico.
 Between 2010 and 2020, interdiction and investigative efforts the Shadow Wolves have led or participated in have resulted in 437 drug and immigration arrests along with the seizure of over 117,264 pounds of drugs, 45 weapons, 251 vehicles and $847,928 in U.S. currency.

Global training missions
In addition to tracking smugglers on the U.S. border, the Shadow Wolves have also been asked to train border guards and customs agents around the world tracking smugglers, in nations including Latvia, Lithuania, Moldova, Estonia, Kazakhstan, and Uzbekistan.  The unit was also used in the effort to hunt terrorists along the border of Afghanistan and Pakistan by training regional border guards in Native American ancestral tracking methods.

In popular culture 
 A documentary film about the Shadow Wolves, Shadow Wolves: Tracking of a Documentary, was directed by Jack Kohler and produced by Joseph Arthur. The documentary profiles an intertribal group of Native Americans.
 The Shadow Wolves were featured in the National Geographic Channel show Border Wars in the episode titled "Walk the Line".
 Shadow Wolves is a 2019 movie that is loosely based on real-life Shadow Wolves.
 In the 2020 film Sonic the Hedgehog, Dr. Robotnik remarks that he learned tracking skills from Shadow Wolves.
 The protagonist of the 2017 Steven Seagal novel, The Way of the Shadow Wolves, is a member of the Shadow Wolves.
 A film about the Shadow Wolves from KosFilms and to be directed by Brian Kosiksy, called Call of the Shadow Wolves, was reportedly preparing for production in southern Arizona in October 2009. No additional information about the release of this film can be located.

References

External links
 Homeland Security Investigations (HSI) Fact sheet
 Shadow-Wolves – unofficial tribute website
Homeland Security Investigations
Border guards
Mexico–United States border
Native American topics
Smuggling in the United States
Tohono O'odham
United States Department of Homeland Security
United States Army Indian Scouts